Cheongyang County (Cheongyang-gun) is a county in South Chungcheong Province, South Korea.  A predominantly rural area, it is known throughout Korea for the spicy Cheongyang chili peppers which are grown there.  Another noted local specialty is the fruit of the gugija.  The county is home to Cheongyang Provincial College.

Climate
Cheongyang has a humid continental climate (Köppen: Dwa), but can be considered a borderline humid subtropical climate (Köppen: Cwa) using the  isotherm.

Notable people
 Kim Hye-soo – actress
 Hong Seok-cheon – host, actor
 Lee Chun-hee – actor
 Song Yo-chan - Lieutenant General, politician, and former acting Prime Minister of South Korea.

Twin towns – sister cities

Cheongyang is twinned with:

 Yeongdeungpo-gu, Seoul
 Seocho-gu, Seoul
 Gangdong-gu, Seoul
 Mapo-gu, Seoul
 Geumcheon-gu, Seoul
 Ansan, Gyeonggi
 Gunpo, Gyeonggi
 Dong-gu, Daejeon

References

External links
 County government website

 
Counties of South Chungcheong Province